Udayapur District (is one of 14 districts of Koshi Province of eastern Nepal.

The district border of Udayapur is drawn by Natural border with rivers and hills. Koshi river in the east of the district separates it from Sunsari District, Sun Kosi river in the north draw a borderline which separates it from Bhojpur and Khotang. Sindhuli District lies in the west across the Tawa khola and foothills of shiwalik in the south separates it from outer terai of Siraha and Saptari. Koshi Tappu Wildlife Reserve lies in the east occupying the area of Udayapur, Sunsari and Saptari District.

According to the former administrative divisions of Nepal, Udayapur falls in Eastern Development Region in Sagarmatha Zone.

History
Before the unification of modern Nepal by Shah kings. Udayapur District was under Sen dynasty. The Kingdom name was Chaudandi and capital of the Kingdom was chaudandigadhi. The last king of the Chaudandi was Karna Sen who fled to Bijayapur when Gorkha army evaded and captured the Sen Kingdom Chaudandi.

Before 1972, Panchawati was Headquarter of Udayapur District, it moved to Gaighat in 1972.

Geography and Climate
Udayapur district is surrounded by Mahabharat hills from north and Shiwalik from south, whereas both hills meet together by west which forms the region a valley Udayapur valley.

Forest cover takes up 67% of the total land area of the district. 28% of the land is cultivated. Small and large river and ponds remain the main source of water in the district. Ponds like 
Rauta Pokhari, Suke Pokhari, Tapli Pokhari, Jogidaha Chure Forest Pond and Jhilke Pokhari are key 
water resources in the district. The district does not possess larger lakes. Triyuga is the largest river in 
this district. Other two major rivers are Tawa Khola from Western side and Vaidyanath River from 
mid-side unite with Tawa River. Other rivers in the district are Kakaru Khola, Yari Khola, Rakula, 
Baruwa Khola, Andheri, Bahadura Khola and Rasuwa Khola. Sunkosi, Saptakosie, Kamala rivers lie 
on the district border.

This inner Terai district (low mid-hills) covers elevations between 360 metres to 2310 metres above sea level. Different topography, geology and altitude have established three distinct physiographic zones in the district as mentioned below.

Mahabharat hills
Mahabharat hill range in this district stretches from Sun Kosi River on northern 
side and links to Inner Terai and in some stretches, to Churiya hills. About 60% of the district is 
covered by middle hills with steep slope and rugged mountain topography. From nearly 1100 m to 
2310 m, this land consists of high hills like Lekhani, Majhkharka, Rautapokhari.

Churiya hills
The Churiya hills stretch across elevations between 550 m to 1100 m. reaching from the upper Mahabharata to Terai land in the south leaving some plain inner Tarai land in between. It occupies about 9% of land of the district and consists of small valleys of inner Terai including Nepaltar, Murkuchi and Mainatar as well as plains like Bahuntar, Bhuttar, and Hardeni. These valleys are situated on Panchawati, Rauta, Bayaldanda and Tawashri VDC respectively.

Inner Terai region
This region occupies around 31% of the district at elevations between 360m to 
550 m above sea level. This region is mainly situated on the border of Triyuga and Tawa River. 
Where inner Tarai exists the Churiya range lies to the south of this region. This region is highly 
affected by the problem of river cutting or floods. Major places of district like Gaighat, Katari and Beltar lie in this region.

Demographics
At the time of the 2011 Nepal census, Udayapur District had a population of 317,532. Of these, 51.7% spoke Nepali, 11.7% Magar, 7.4% Tharu, 6.4% Chamling, 5.8% Tamang, 3.9% Maithili, 3.7% Bantawa, 2.7% Rai, 1.8% Danuwar, 1.1% Newar, 0.5% Puma, 0.4% Majhi, 0.4% Sunuwar, 0.3% Thulung, 0.3% Urdu, 0.3% Wambule, 0.2% Bahing, 0.2% Bhojpuri, 0.1% Dumi, 0.1% Limbu, 0.1% Sampang, 0.1% Sherpa and 0.2% other languages as their first language.

In terms of ethnicity/caste, 21.5% were Chhetri, 17.3% Rai, 13.9% Magar, 7.6% Tharu, 6.9% Tamang, 6.0% Hill Brahmin, 5.2% Kami, 3.4% Newar, 2.9% Danuwar, 2.8% Damai/Dholi, 2.6% Sarki, 1.2% Musahar, 1.0% Majhi, 0.9% Gharti/Bhujel, 0.9% Sunuwar, 0.7% Musalman, 0.7% Thakuri, 0.6% Sanyasi/Dasnami, 0.4% Kathabaniyan, 0.4% Teli, 0.3% Chamling, 0.3% Halwai, 0.2% Hajam/Thakur, 0.2% Kalwar, 0.2% Sherpa, 0.2% Sudhi, 0.2% Yadav, 0.1% Bantawa, 0.1% Bote, 0.1% Dhimal, 0.1% Dom, 0.1% Gurung, 0.1% Limbu, 0.1% Sonar, 0.1% other Terai, 0.1% Thami and 0.3% others.

In terms of religion, 72.6% were Hindu, 12.1% Buddhist, 9.9% Kirati, 2.4% Christian, 2.1% Prakriti, 0.7% Muslim and 0.2% others.

In terms of literacy, 68.6% could read and write, 2.6% could only read and 28.8% could neither read nor write.

Administration
Udayapur District is administered by Udayapur District Coordination Committee (Udayapur DCC). The Udayapur DCC is elected by Udayapur District Assembly. The head of Udayapur DCC is Mr. Khadag Bahadur Pariyar (Darnal) and Mrs. Ganga Rai is deputy head of Udayapur DCC.

Udayapur District Administration Office under Ministry of Home Affairs co-operate with Udayapur DCC to maintain peace, order and security in the district. The officer of District Administration office called CDO and current CDO of Udayapur DAO is Bishnu Kumar Karkee.

Udayapur District Court is a Judicial court to see the cases of people on district level.

Division
Udayapur District is divided into total 8 local level bodies, 4 local level body categorized into Rural municipality and 4 into Municipality:

Former Administrative Divisions
Formerly, Udayapur had three municipality and many VDCs. VDCs were the local administrative units for villages.

Fulfilling the requirement of the new constitution of Nepal 2015, on 10 March 2017 all VDCs were nullified and formed new units after grouping VDCs.

Constituencies
Udayapur District is divided into 2 Parliamentary constituencies and 4 Provincial constituencies:

Transportation
Gaighat, the headquarter (center) of Udaydpur District is connected with NH-09 (Sagarmatha Highway), which connects Udayapur with NH-01 (East-west Highway) at Kadmaha.

The F057 feeder road also connects Sindhuli via Katari.

Interesting Places
 Tribeni: It is a place in Katari municipality where the three rivers Kamla, Tawa and Dudhauli adjoins. It is visited by many devotees on the occasion of Makar (Maghe) Sankrati (first day of Nepali month of Magh) every year. On this occasion, a large fair is organized that lasts for about three weeks.
 Rauta: Rauta is a holy place for Hindus located in Rautamai rural municipality. There is a temple of Mahadev and a Pond called Rauta Pokhari. The pond is in the center of surrounded evergreen tall forest.
 Koshi Tappu: Koshi Tappu is a protected area for wildlife. It is located in south-eastern part of Udayapur near Koshi River. Rampur is the nearest city in Udayapur from Koshi Tappu .
 Chaudandigadhi Durbar: The remains of Chaudandigadhi fort of Sen Kingdom can be seen in Chaudandi. The kingdom of Chaudandigadhi was captured by Gorkha Army on 16 July 1773. The remains of Chaudandigadhi is now part of Chaudandigadhi municipality.
 Odari kholako jharna" (156m) (waterfall)
 Khuwa jharna"(71m). (waterfall)

See also
 Administration in Province No. 1
Zones of Nepal
Districts of Nepal

References

External links

 Udayapur.Info: Information about Udayapur District, Nepal

 
Districts of Nepal established during Rana regime or before
Districts of Koshi Province